Worsak Kanok-Nukulchai is a Thai structural engineer and university administrator, currently serving as Executive Director of the Chulalongkorn School of Integrated Innovation at Chulalongkorn University. Kanok-Nukulchai served as the President of the Asian Institute of Technology (AIT) from 2014 to 2018, the first Thai national and alumnus to become AIT's president. He is a Royal Scholar of the Royal Society of Thailand.

Selected publications 

 A simple and efficient finite element for plate bending International Journal for Numerical Methods in Engineering (1977)
 A finite element method for a class of contact-impact problems Computer methods in applied mechanics and engineering (1976)

References 

Worsak Kanok-Nukulchai
Asian Institute of Technology alumni
University of California, Berkeley alumni
Worsak Kanok-Nukulchai
Worsak Kanok-Nukulchai
Living people
1948 births
Asian Institute of Technology
Worsak Kanok-Nukulchai